The Torres Martinez Desert Cahuilla Indians is a federally recognized tribe of Cahuilla Indians, located in Imperial and Riverside counties in California. Their autonym is Mau-Wal-Mah Su-Kutt Menyil, which means "among the palms, deer moon." in the Cahuilla language.

Torres Martinez Indian Reservation
It was established in 1876 and was named for the village of Toro and the Martinez Indian Agency. In 1970, 42 of the 217 enrolled tribal members lived on the reservation. As of the 2010 Census the population was 5,594.

Government
The tribe's headquarters is located in Thermal, California. Their tribal administration  is as follows:

 Tribal Chairman Thomas Tortez Jr.
 Vice-Chairman Joseph Mirelez
 Secretary Altrena Santillanes
 Treasurer RoseMarie Morreo
 Council Member Elesha Duro
 Council Member Arthur Lopez
 Council Member Proxy Gary Wayne Resvaloso Jr.

Economic development
The tribe owns and operates the Red Earth Casino in Salton City, California.

Cemetery
The tribe maintains a small (48 interments) cemetery on Martinez Road in Thermal.

See also
 Mission Indians

Notes

References
 Bean, Lowell John. "Cahuilla." Heizer, Robert F., volume ed. Handbook of North American Indians: California, Volume 8. Washington, DC: Smithsonian Institution, 1978. .
 Eargle, Jr., Dolan H. California Indian Country: The Land and the People. San Francisco: Tree Company Press, 1992. .
 Pritzker, Barry M. A Native American Encyclopedia: History, Culture, and Peoples. Oxford: Oxford University Press, 2000. .

Further reading

External links
 Torres Martinez Desert Cahuilla Indians, official website
 

Cahuilla
Chemehuevi
California Mission Indians
Populated places in Imperial County, California
Native American tribes in California
Federally recognized tribes in the United States
Native American tribes in Riverside County, California